The following is a timeline of the Tenrikyo religion, highlighting significant events since the birth of Tenrikyo's foundress Miki Nakayama. Specific dates are provided in parentheses; the lunar calendar is indicated with ordinal numbers (e.g. 18th day of 4th month) while the Gregorian calendar is indicated with name and number (e.g. August 15).

1700s

1798
(18th day of 4th month)  Miki was born into the Maegawa family in Sanmaiden Village, Yamabe County, Yamato Province (present-day Nara Prefecture).

1800s

1810
Miki married Nakayama Zenbei of Shoyashiki Village.

1816
Miki attended a training course in "fivefold transmission" (gojū sōden) at the Zenpuku Temple of Jōdo Shin Buddhism.

1837
Miki's son, Shūji, began to suffer from pains in his legs. Nakano Ichibei, a mountain ascetic (shugenja), performed prayer rituals (kitō) over the next twelve months.

1838
(23rd day of 10th month)  An incantation (yosekaji) was performed for Shūji with Miki as the medium. During the incantation, Miki went into trance and had a revelation from Tenri-Ō-no-Mikoto.
(26th day of 10th month)  Miki was settled as the Shrine of Tsukihi (tsukihi no yashiro), marking the founding of the religious teaching. She remained in seclusion for the next three years.

1853
Zenbei died at the age of sixty-six. 
The main house of the Nakayama residence was dismantled and sold.
Kokan, Miki's youngest daughter, went to Naniwa (present-day Osaka) to spread the name of Tenri-Ō-no-Mikoto.

1854
Miki's daughter, Oharu, gave birth to her first child, marking the beginning of the “Grant of Safe Childbirth” (obiya yurushi).

1857
A follower made an offering for the first time.

1864
Miki began to bestow the Sazuke to devoted followers.
(Fifth month) Iburi Izō of Ichinomoto Village came to see Miki for the first time.
The construction of the Place for the Service (tsutome basho) began.

1865
The last 7.5 acres of rice fields belonging to the Nakayama family were mortgaged.
Miki went to Harigabessho Village to confront Sukezō, who claimed the religious authority in place of Miki.

1866
Miki began to compose the Mikagura-uta and teach the songs and hand movements for the first section.
Nakayama Shinnosuke, who is to become the first Shinbashira, is born.

1867
Shūji obtained official authorization from the Yoshida Administrative Office of Shinto (Yoshida jingi kanryō) to conduct religious activities.
Miki taught the songs and hand movements for the fifth section of the Mikagura-uta and instructed the followers over a three-year period.

1869
Miki began writing the Ofudesaki, one of Tenrikyo's three scriptures.

1874
Miki received the kagura masks for the Kagura Service.
Miki began to wear red clothes.

1875
The identification of the Jiba (jiba sadame) took place.
Miki's daughter Kokan died at age 39.
Miki taught the song and hand movements for the third section of the Mikagura-uta and eleven different Services for specific purposes.

1876
Shūji obtained a license from Sakai Prefecture to operate a steam bath and an inn in order to allow worshipers to gather without suppression from the police.

1880
Tenrin-Ō-Kōsha was formally inaugurated under the auspices of the Jifuku Temple.

1881
Shūji died at the age of sixty-one.

1882
The steam bath and the inn were closed down. Tenrin-Ō-Kōsha was officially dismissed by the Jifuku Temple.
Miki completed the writing of the Ofudesaki.

1885
The movement to establish the church (kyōkai setsuritsu undō) began to be conducted with Shinnosuke as the leader.

1887
(26th of 1st month)  Miki “withdrew from physical life” (utsushimi wo kakushita) at the age of ninety.
Iburi Izō became the Honseki and began to deliver divine directions (recorded in the Osashizu) as well as bestow the Sazuke on behalf of Miki.

1888
Shintō Tenri Kyōkai was established in Tokyo under the direct supervision of the Shinto Main Bureau. The location was subsequently moved back to present-day Tenri.
The Mikagura-uta was officially published by Tenri Kyōkai.

1893 

 Earliest overseas mission which began at Korea. The number of Tenrikyo churches and adherents in Korea would later increase during the early 20th century.

1896
The tenth anniversary of the foundress was observed.
(April 6) The Home Ministry issued "Directive No. 12" to enforce strict control on Tenri Kyōkai.

1899
The movement for sectarian independence (ippa dokuritsu undō) began.

1900s

1903
Tenrikyō kyōten (The Doctrine of Tenrikyō), also known as Meiji kyōten, was published.

1907
Iburi Izō died, marking the end of the Osashizu.

1908
Tenri Seminary (Tenri kyōkō) and Tenri Junior High School were founded respectively.
Tenrikyō gained sectarian independence from the Shinto Main Bureau.
Nakayama Shinnosuke, the first Shinbashira, became the superintendent (艦長 kanchō) of Tenrikyō.

1910
Tenrikyo Women's Association (天理教婦人会 Tenrikyō fujinkai) was founded.

1912
(February 25) The Home Ministry invited Tenrikyo to the Three Religions Conference (三教会同 Sankyokaido) as a member of Sect Shinto.

1913
(December 25) Construction of what is now the North Worship Hall of the Main Sanctuary was completed.

1914
Nakayama Shinnosuke, the first Shinbashira, died at the age of forty-eight.

1915
Nakayama Shōzen became the superintendent of Tenrikyō at the age of nine. (Yamazawa Tamezō served as the acting superintendent until Shōzen came of age in 1925.)

1918
Tenrikyo Young Men's Association (天理教青年会 Tenrikyō seinenkai) was founded.

1925
Tenri School of Foreign Languages (天理外国語学校 Tenri gaikokugo gakkō) was established along with what would later become Tenri Central Library (天理図書館 Tenri toshokan). Also, Tenrikyō Printing Office (Tenrikyō kyōchō insatsusho) and the Department of Doctrine and Historical Materials (Kyōgi oyobi shiryō shūseibu) were established.

1928
The Ofudesaki was published.

1931
The publication of the entire Osashizu was completed, making the three main scriptures of Tenrikyo available to all followers for the first time.

1934
(October 25) The South Worship Hall of the Main Sanctuary was completed.
The Kagura Service was restored for the first time since it had been prohibited in 1896.

1938
Nakayama Shōzen announced the adjustment (kakushin) to comply with the state authority's demand.

1945
(August 15) Nakayama Shōzen announced the restoration (fukugen) of the teaching, on the same day Japan announced its surrender.

1946
The Mikagura-uta was republished and offered to local churches.

1948
The Ofudesaki, accompanied with commentaries, as well as the first volume of the Osashizu were republished and offered to churches.

1949
Tenri School of Foreign Languages was reorganized as Tenri University.
The Doctrine of Tenrikyo was republished to accurately reflect Nakayama Miki's teachings.

1954
(April 1) Tenri City was instated.
Construction of the Oyasato-yakata building complex begins, a year after Nakayama Shozen's announcement.

1956
(October 26) The Life of Oyasama was published.

1966
Tenrikyo Children's Association (天理教少年会 Tenrikyō shōnenkai) was established.

1967
Nakayama Shōzen, the second Shinbashira, died at the age of sixty-two. Nakayama Zenye became the third Shinbashira.

1970
Tenrikyō left the Sect Shinto Union (教派神道連合会 Kyōha Shintō rengōkai).

1976
(January 26) Anecdotes of Oyasama was published.

1981
(July 25) The West Worship Hall of the Main Sanctuary was completed.

1984
(October 25) The East Worship Hall of the Main Sanctuary was completed, thereby completing construction of all four sides of the Main Sanctuary.

1986
The centennial anniversary of Nakayama Miki was observed.

1998
Nakayama Zenji became the fourth Shinbashira.

1998
Tenrikyō held the “Tenrikyo-Christian Dialogue” between Tenri University and the Pontifical Gregorian University in Rome.

2000s

2002
Tenrikyō held the “Tenrikyo-Christian Dialogue II” between Tenri University and the Pontifical Gregorian University in Tenri.

2013
Nakayama Daisuke was nominated as the successor to the position of the Shinbashira after Zenji.

2014
Nakayama Zenye, the third Shinbashira, died at the age of eighty-two.

Sources
"Tenrikyō" from World Religions & Spirituality Project
Tenrikyo Doyusha. Tracing the Model Path: A Close Look into The Life of Oyasama, p. 320-7. 2014.
Tenrikyo Overseas Mission Department. Tenrikyo: The Path to Joyousness. 1998, Tenri, Japan.

References 

Religion timelines
Tenrikyo